Marco Esposito (born 8 February 1980) is an Italian footballer.

Club career
Esposito started his career at Meda of Serie D. He won promotion with the club and played a full Serie C2 season. In summer 2000, he joined Cittadella of Serie B. He followed the team relegated to Serie C1 in summer 2002. In July 2003 he joined Serie A side Ancona, which he made his Serie A debut on 23 November 2003 against Brescia. He then played for Chievo after Ancona relegated in summer 2004. In summer 2005, he signed for Bari which he played for 4 Serie B seasons. In July 2009, he left Bari for Mantova, signed a 3-year deal. 

Esposito went on trial to Ekstraklasa side Wisła Kraków in July 2010. On 27 July 2010 it was confirmed that he had signed a two-year contract with CSKA Sofia.

In December 2010 he returned to Italy for Portogruaro.

On 10 August 2011 he was signed by Pisa.

On 26 June 2012 he was interrogation by the prosecutor. After a plea bargain, he was banned 3 months and 10 days for not reporting match-fixing activities.

Honours
Serie B winner: 2009
Serie D winner: 1999

References

External links
http://www.gazzetta.it/speciali/serie_b/2008_nw/giocatori/53447.shtml

1980 births
Living people
People from Massafra
Italian footballers
A.C. Milan players
A.C. Monza players
A.S. Cittadella players
A.C. Ancona players
A.C. ChievoVerona players
S.S.C. Bari players
Serie A players
Association football defenders
A.C. Meda 1913 players
Footballers from Apulia
Sportspeople from the Province of Taranto